Malemba-Nkulu is a city of the Democratic Republic of the Congo. As of 2012, it had an estimated population of 29,970.

References 

Populated places in Haut-Katanga Province